is a Japanese football player and manager and current manager WE League club of JEF United Chiba.

Playing career
Sarusawa was born in Hiroshima Prefecture on June 9, 1969. After graduating from Osaka University of Health and Sport Sciences, he played Kagawa Shiun from 1992 to 1999.

Coaching career
In 2017, Sarusawa became a coach at J2 League club Renofa Yamaguchi FC under manager Nobuhiro Ueno. In May when Renofa was at the 20th place of 22 clubs, manager Ueno resigned for poor results. Sarusawa managed the club as caretaker. Although Sarusawa managed 2 matches, Renofa lost both matches. In June, Carlos Mayor became new manager, so Sarusawa he resigned as manager.

Managerial statistics

References

External links

1969 births
Living people
Osaka University of Health and Sport Sciences alumni
Association football people from Hiroshima Prefecture
Japanese footballers
Kamatamare Sanuki players
Japanese football managers
J2 League managers
Renofa Yamaguchi FC managers
Association footballers not categorized by position